"Such a Parcel of Rogues in a Nation" is a Scottish folk song whose lyrics are taken from a poem written by Robert Burns in 1791, listed as number 5516 in the Roud Folk Song Index. It has continued to be associated with Scottish nationalism and also been referenced in other situations where politicians' actions have gone against popular opinion.

Background
In 1695, an Act of the Scottish Parliament set up the "Company of Scotland Trading in Africa and the Indies" generally just called the Company of Scotland. Although the Act limited investors to a maximum of £3000, simple maths shows that the investors found a way around this and on average invested £35,000 each (around £4 million in modern terms). A total of £400,000 was raised.

The main venture undertaken was the disastrous Darien Scheme, a very ill-advised idea to colonise Panama. Although the investors and shareholders had in effect lost everything by the start of 1699, the over-optimism and distances involved meant that money continued to be poured into an already pointless venture. The main investors, some 30 in number, were Scots or ex-Scots living in London. In the early 1700s a plan was devised, partly within the group, and partly with the necessary politicians, to reimburse the investors 100% of their loss (plus a small bonus) if (but only if) they negotiated the relinquishing of the Scottish Parliament and passed all parliamentary powers to England. Of the 40 signatories to the Act of Union of 1707 are compared to those on the Company of Scotland the "rogues" can be identified. These include:

Adam Cockburn, Lord Ormiston
Francis Montgomerie of Giffen
Sir John Clerk of Penicuik
Sir Patrick Johnston, Lord Provost of Edinburgh and the broker of the deal

Scottish politicians signing the Act were:

Hew Dalrymple, Lord North Berwick
John Erskine, Earl of Mar
James Ogilvy, Earl of Seafield
Archibald Primrose, 1st Earl of Rosebery
Sir David Dalrymple, 1st Baronet

Other shareholders compensated (but not signing the Act of Union) included:

James Foulis, 3rd Baronet of Colinton (as a commissioner for Edinburgh he possible jointly brokered the deal with Sir Patrick Johnston)
James Balfour of Pilrig
James Smollett of Bonhill (grandfather of Tobias Smollett)
Robert Chieslie of Dalry, former Lord Provost of Edinburgh (Robert died before the compensation was paid and his niece Rachel received the compensation)
Robert Corse a Glasgow sugar and tobacco merchant (Robert died before compensation was paid)
John Maxwell, Lord Pollok
John Hamilton, 2nd Lord Belhaven and Stenton
Robert Blackwood of Pitreavie
Samuel McLellan, Lord Provost of Edinburgh in 1707 and first MP after the Union.

One Englishman was a member of the Company of Scotland and signatory to the Act, and certainly under modern rules would be deemed to have an unacceptable personal interest and motive in the Act:

John Smith (Chancellor of the Exchequer)

History of the poem
"Such a Parcel of Rogues in a Nation" was written by Scotland's National poet Robert Burns in 1791. He decried those members of the Parliament of Scotland who signed the Act of Union with England in 1707. Burns contrasted their treachery to the country with the tradition of martial valour and resistance commonly associated with such historic figures as Robert the Bruce and William Wallace. The poet states that he wished to have lain in the grave with Bruce or Wallace, rather than having seen this treacherous sale of Scotland were it in his own lifetime.

The melody and lyrics were published in volume 1 of James Hogg's Jacobite Reliques of 1819 (no. 36).

Recordings
The song was revived in the 20th century by Ewan MacColl, whose recording of it can be found on the collection The Real MacColl. Steeleye Span later included it under the name "Rogues in a Nation" on their album, Parcel of Rogues, and it has been covered by numerous other musicians, including The Corries, Alastair McDonald, Jean Redpath, The Dubliners (Luke Kelly), Dick Gaughan, Makem and Clancy, Hamish Imlach, Old Blind Dogs, The Delgados, Jesse Ferguson—The Bard of Cornwall and Heelster Gowdie.

A spoken word version was recorded by Bill Drummond of The KLF as the closer of his solo album, The Man (1986).

Lyrics
The song's lyrics are in Lowlands Scots.

Fareweel to a' our Scottish fame,
Fareweel our ancient glory;
Fareweel ev'n to the Scottish name,
Sae fam'd in martial story.
Now Sark rins over Solway sands,
An' Tweed rins to the ocean,
To mark where England's province stands-
Such a parcel of rogues in a nation!

What force or guile could not subdue,
Thro' many warlike ages,
Is wrought now by a coward few,
For hireling traitor's wages.
The English steel we could disdain,
Secure in valour's station;
But English gold has been our bane -
Such a parcel of rogues in a nation!

O would, ere I had seen the day
That Treason thus could sell us,
My auld grey head had lien in clay,
Wi' Bruce and loyal Wallace!
But pith and power, till my last hour,
I'll mak this declaration;
We're bought and sold for English gold-
Such a parcel of rogues in a nation!

References

External links

Digitised copy of volumes 1 and 2 of The Relics of Jacobite Scotland by James Hogg, printed between 1819 and 1821, from National Library of Scotland.

Traditional ballads
Scottish folk songs
Scottish patriotic songs
Songs with lyrics by Robert Burns
Poetry by Robert Burns
1791 poems